The 2010 Vuelta a España was held from 28 August to 19 September and was won by Vincenzo Nibali. The race began in Seville and ended, as is tradition, in Madrid.

The race covered . There was critical analysis that this Vuelta, which commemorates the 75th anniversary of the first edition of the race, was an especially difficult one and that stage 16 was the queen stage.

The stage 1 team time trial was held at night.

Vuelta runner-up Ezequiel Mosquera and  teammate David García Dapena were announced on September 30 to have given positive tests for hydroxyethyl starch during the race, a substance which is known as a masking agent for erythropoietin (EPO). All results from Mosquera after 12 September (stage 15) were annulled, which caused him to lose his second place. García later was announced to have tested positive for EPO during the race as well.

Teams

Sixteen teams were automatically selected due to previous agreements and there were six wildcard places. Three of these were given to UCI Professional Continental teams, and three to UCI ProTour teams.

Team RadioShack was not invited despite having a ProTour license.

Stages
For details see 2010 Vuelta a España, Stage 1 to Stage 11 and 2010 Vuelta a España, Stage 12 to Stage 21

Classification leadership

In the 2010 Vuelta a España, four different jerseys were awarded. For the general classification, calculated by adding the finishing times of the stages per cyclist after deduction of time bonuses for high placings in stage finishes and at intermediate sprints, the leader received a red jersey. This classification was considered the most important of the Vuelta a España, and the winner of the general classification was considered the winner of the Vuelta.

Additionally, there was also a points classification, which awarded a green jersey. In the points classification, cyclists received points for finishing in the top 15 in a stage. The winner got 25 points, second place 20, third 16, fourth 14, fifth 12, sixth 10, and one point per place less down the line, to a single point for fifteenth. In addition, some points were won in intermediate sprints.

There was also a mountains classification, which awarded a blue-spotted white jersey. In the mountains classifications, points were won by reaching the top of a mountain before other cyclists. Each climb was categorized, either first, second, third or "special" category, the last of which is equivalent to the Hors catégorie rating used in races such as the Tour de France.

Finally, there was the combination classification. This is calculated by adding the rankings in the general, points and mountains classifications; the cyclist with the lowest combined ranking is the leader in the combination classification, and receives a white jersey.

There was also a classification for teams. In this classification, the times of the best three cyclists per stage were added, and the team with the lowest time is the leader.

1 Initially, the team time trial gave points toward the points classification. These points were later removed.

2 All results from Mosquera after 12 September (stage 15) were originally annulled. However this was overturned by a Spanish Court.

Standings

General classification

Points classification

King of the Mountains classification

Combination classification

Teams classification

References

External links

 Official website

 
2010
1
Vuelta a Espana